Dr. Abdul Ghafoor: (5 May 1959 – 28 January 2020) was an Indian politician who served as Minister of Minority Welfare in government of Bihar from 20 November 2015 to 26 July 2017. He served as a member of the Bihar Legislative Assembly representing Mahishi vidhan sabha for 4 terms in 1995, 2000, 2010 and 2015. His political party was Rashtriya Janta Dal (RJD).

Early life and education

Dr. Abdul Ghafoor was born to a farmer Md. Jamal and Bibi Fatima on 5 May 1959 in a small village of Bauharwa in Saharsa district of Bihar. He finished his early education (Matriculation) from Islamia High School, Simri Bakhtiyarpur, Saharsa in 1974. He completed his higher Secondary in 1976. He graduated (B.A.) from Saharsa College, Saharsa in 1979. Later on, he moved to Patna to pursue Masters in Arts (M.A.) from Patna University in 1981. He held a PhD degree in Urdu from Patna University.
He was a professor of Urdu Parvati Science College since 1982, a position he held till his death in 2020.

Political objective

Inspired by the leadership and ideologies of Prameshwar Kunwar he was inclined towards politics from his early youth. His inspiration deepened after the famous JP movement. Being associated with the village, he was involved in the main issues and personally felt the basic needs of the poor people and the minority community. He always believed that they should be given an equal chance to grow, live and prosper on par with the other privileged people. He continuously strove for the upliftment of the backward and underprivileged section of the society. Secularism and Socialism were the two pillars of his politics. He was always seen as one of the cleanest politicians of the state. He was often referred as Gandhi of Kosi by his colleagues and followers.

Political career

He first contested on a Janata dal ticket from Mahishi Vidhan sabha and defeated the veteran congress leader and freedom fighter Lahtan Choudhary of Congress in 1995. In 1998 when the Janata Dal split due to the differences between Sharad Yadav and Lalu Prasad Yadav to form Rashtriya Janata Dal (RJD) and Janata Dal (United), he chose Lalu Prasad Yadav and joined RJD. He won convincingly in 2000 from an RJD ticket by a huge margin of approximately 20,000 votes defeating Surendra Yadav, an independent candidate. In the debacle and toppling of Lalu Yadav in 2005 election, he lost from Mahishi to Surendra Yadav marginally. The assembly could not be formed due to unclear mandate hence state was forced into fresh election. In the re-election he was asked to shift his constituency to Saharsa Vidhan Sabha Constituency. Accepting the party decision he contested from Saharsa in Oct 2005 election and lost to BJP's Sanjiv Jha by approximately 6000 votes.

He worked hard and connected to the masses in the villages of his native assembly Mahishi and was determined to bounce back into the Bihar politics. His dedication and tireless effort was rewarded, and he was given back his home constituency of Mahishi in 2010 elections. Though Lalu Yadav's RJD was very badly defeated, he came victorious as the lone RJD candidate from the Koshi region defeating RajKumar sah of JD(U)by a margin of 1717 votes.

Election 2015

Assumed to be a direct fight between the Grand alliance of RJD, JD(U) and INC, Vs NDA.
RJD contested election on 101 Seats, JDU on 101, Congress on 41.
Dr. Abdul Ghafoor once again contesting from the Mahishi seat defeated the nearest rival Chandan Kumar Sah by a comprehensive margin on 26,135 votes. This Victory would make Dr. Ghafoor the longest serving MLA from Mahishi.
Grand Alliance got a Landslide victory by claiming 178  out of 243 seats while BJP+ managed a mere 58 seats.
However, this alliance lasted only 20 months when Nitish Kumar resigned on 26 July 2017 at 5 PM following JD(U)'s remarriage to BJP and re-forming the government on 27 July 2017 at 10 AM.

Dr. Abdul Ghafoor was sworn in as the Minority Welfare  minister in the Nitish Kumar government on 20 November 2015. He was in charge of the ministry until the resignation of Mr Nitish Kumar on 26 July 2017 following his breakaway from Mahagathbandhan and subsequent merger with NDA.

Death and legacy

Dr. Abdul Ghafoor was diagnosed with advanced stage of liver cancer in December 2019 and was admitted to AIIMS, New Delhi, for treatment. His health never fully recovered and breathed last on 28 January 2020 6:15 AM at ILBS, New Delhi.

CM Nitish Kumar condoled the demise or one of the finest leader of Bihar and announced that Dr. Ghafoor would be buried with full State Honors. His body wrapped in Indian Flag was flown to Patna where Guard of Honor was given at the Airport followed by the Chief Minister Shri Nitish Kumar, Governor of Bihar Shri Phagu Chauhan, Bihar State Congress Minority Chairman Minnat Rahmani along with the leader from all over Bihar paying their respect at Vidhan Sabha. RJD Leaders like Tejashwi Yadav, State RJD Chief Jagada Nand Singh, Former Minister Abdul Bari Siddiqui and others paid their respect at the RJD Headquarters in Patna.

Namaz-e-Janaza was held at the ancestral village Bauharwa in Saharsa which was attended by more than 70,000 well wishers. He was honored with gun salute and buried at the ancestral quabristan in presence of the family members, DM, SP, politicians from across party line for State Funeral on 29 January 2020.

Others
He was also the chairman of Bihar State haj Committee and held the post between 2003 and 2006.

He was active on social media and was easily reachable by public via Twitter - https://twitter.com/DrAGhafoor and on Facebook - https://www.facebook.com/DrAGhafoor

Details of election affidavit can be found here

References

21st-century Indian Muslims
2020 deaths
Bihar MLAs 2015–2020
Bihar MLAs 2000–2005
Bihar MLAs 2010–2015
People from Saharsa district
State cabinet ministers of Bihar
Rashtriya Janata Dal politicians
Janata Dal politicians
Samata Party politicians
1959 births